was the pen-name of an early modern feminist novelist in Shōwa period Japan.

Biography 

Tamura was born in the plebeian Asakusa district of Tokyo, where her father was a rice broker. At the age of seventeen she entered the literature faculty of Nihon Joshi Daigaku Japan Women's University. However, the long commute by foot, from her home affected her health and forced her to withdraw after only a single term. She began her writing career as a disciple of Kōda Rohan, but later turned to Okamoto Kido for advice, and briefly flirted with a career as a stage actress. Her novel Akirame ("Resignation", 1911) won the Osaka Asahi Shimbun literary prize. Her experiences in the theatre are illustrated in "Chooroo" (Mockery, 1912). She followed this with Miira no kuchibeni ("Lip Rouge on a Mummy", 1913), and Onna Sakusha ("Woman Writer", 1913). She became a best-selling writer, and contributed numerous works to such mainstream literary magazines as Chūō Kōrōn and Shincho.

In 1918, she left her husband Tamura Shogyo to follow her lover, Asahi Shimbun journalist Suzuki Etsu, to Vancouver, in Canada, where she lived until 1936. On her return to Japan, she had an affair with leftist Kubokawa Tsurujiro.

In 1942, she moved to Shanghai, China, then under Japanese occupation, where she edited a Chinese literary magazine Nu-Sheng. She died of a brain hemorrhage in Shanghai in 1945, and her grave is at the temple of Tokei-ji in Kamakura.

After her death, her royalties were used to establish a literary prize for women writers.

References

Sources 

 Setouchi, Harumi. Tamura Toshiko. Kodansha. (1993). . 
 Fowler, Edward.  "Tamura Toshiko".  The Modern Murasaki Ed. Rebecca Copeland and Melek Ortabasi.  New York: Columbia University Press, 2006. 339-347.
 Akiko Esashi and the History Society (eds.), The Women Who Pioneered the Age, Vol. 2, Kanagawa Shimbun, 2011, pp. 142-143, ISBN 978-4-87645-475-4.

External links 

 e-texts of works at Aozora Bunko 
 Synopsis of Lipstick on a Mummy (Miira no kuchibeni) at JLPP (Japanese Literature Publishing Project) 

1884 births
1945 deaths
people from Tokyo
Japanese women novelists
Japanese feminists
20th-century Japanese novelists
20th-century Japanese women writers
Japan Women's University alumni